Angerville is a northern French toponym, originally from a Norse personal name Asgeir plus the designation ville for "farm, village". It may refer to these places in France:

 Angerville, Calvados, in the Calvados département
 Angerville, Essonne, in the Essonne département
 Angerville-Bailleul, in the Seine-Maritime département
 Angerville-la-Campagne, in the Eure département
 Angerville-la-Martel, in the Seine-Maritime département
 Angerville-l'Orcher, in the Seine-Maritime département

See also
Dangerfield